Gimghoul Neighborhood Historic District is a national historic district located at Chapel Hill, Orange County, North Carolina.  The district encompasses 42 contributing buildings and 1 contributing structure in a predominantly residential section of Chapel Hill.  The district developed after 1924 as faculty housing and includes notable examples of Colonial Revival and Bungalow / American Craftsman style architecture. The acreage was sold for development by the Order of Gimghoul to fund the construction of neighboring Hippol Castle.

It was listed on the National Register of Historic Places in 1993.

References

Houses on the National Register of Historic Places in North Carolina
Historic districts on the National Register of Historic Places in North Carolina
Colonial Revival architecture in North Carolina
Buildings and structures in Chapel Hill-Carrboro, North Carolina
National Register of Historic Places in Orange County, North Carolina
Houses in Orange County, North Carolina
1924 establishments in North Carolina